Clare Eichner-Taylor (born December 7, 1969) is a retired female long-distance runner from the United States, who is best known for winning the women's 3000 metres at the 1993 Summer Universiade.

Achievements

Personal bests
1500 metres - 4:12.71 min (1999)
3000 metres - 9:00.39 min (2001)
5000 metres - 15:26.95 min (2001)

External links

1969 births
Living people
American female long-distance runners
Universiade medalists in athletics (track and field)
Universiade gold medalists for the United States
Medalists at the 1993 Summer Universiade
21st-century American women